Boromlia (Ukrainian: Боромля) is a railway station in Novhorodske (near Boromlia), Sumy Oblast, Ukraine. It is at the intersection of three lines of the Sumy Directorate of Southern Railways: the Boromlia-Lebedynska line, the Basy-Boromlia line, and the Boromlia-Kyrykivka line.

History

The station was opened in 1878 as part of the Kharkiv-Mykolaiv Railway. In the same year, the station adopted its first train - a small train with coal, which was supplied for the furnace of the only roller mill in the district. In the following years, traffic at the station became much more active, and the station sent an average of more than 1️ million tons of cargo per year, mostly bread, and received twice less cargo. In 1895 a small branch was built to the Lebedynska station, thanks to which the station became a hub. The station, like the village (8 km from the station), got its name from the river Boromlia (from the words "bir" (certain type of forest) and "imla" (mist)), because around the river there are dense forests and in the valley there often was mist. Anton Chekhov mentioned the station in his letters, comparing Boromlia with small and quiet villages on a trip across the Urals, where there are mostly industrial cities that are noisy.

During the turbulent 20th century the station was destroyed, and to this day no historic building has survived, except for the barracks for railroad workers. The station was particularly hit hard by World War II. It was then captured by German troops and liberated on August 10, 1943 during the Battle of the Kursk Arc. The mass grave located near the station, where 66 soldiers who defended their native land are buried, reminds of these events.

The modern station was built in the 1970s according to a typical project. It is devoid of any decor - a typical example of functionalism. In 2008, the station was reconstructed, and it acquired its modern appearance.

The uniqueness of the station is that it is located on the border not only two different settlements, but also of two districts of Sumy Oblast, as Novhorodske belongs to Trostyanets Raion, and Zaliznychne to Lebedyn Raion. Both raions define the station as their property.

Passenger service

The station serves both passenger and suburban trains.

Notes

 Tariff Guide No. 4. Book 1 (as of 05/15/2021) (Russian) Archived 05/15/2021.
 Arkhangelsky A.S., Arkhangelsky V.A. in two books. - M.: Transport, 1981. (rus.)

References

External links

Boromlya station on railwayz.info
Schedule for passenger trains
Schedule for suburban trains
Boromlya station on tokatema
Boromlya station on Trainphoto

Railway stations in Sumy Oblast
Sumy
Buildings and structures in Sumy Oblast